Philip John Sarboe (August 22, 1911 – November 19, 1985) was an American football player and coach. He played college football at the State College of Washington—now Washington State University—and professionally in National Football League (NFL) with the Boston Redskins, Chicago Cardinals, and Brooklyn Dodgers.

Early years and college playing career
Born in Fairbanks, Alaska, Sarboe graduated from Lincoln High School in Tacoma, Washington, and was a three-sport athlete in the Pacific Coast Conference at the State College of Washington in Pullman — now Washington State University. On a basketball scholarship from head coach Jack Friel, he also played shortstop in baseball under head coach Buck Bailey, and had his greatest success in football, most notably as a fullback under head coach Babe Hollingbery. Sarboe played in the East–West Shrine Game in January 1934. Although he had minor league offers in baseball, he chose to play professional football.

Professional playing career
Sarboe played three seasons in the National Football League, starting with Boston Redskins in 1934. He completed only 42.3 percent of his passes for just 1,133 yards, had a 4–26 career touchdown to interception ratio, and a career passer rating of 27.9.

Coaching career
Sarboe began his coaching career in 1937 in southeastern Washington at Clarkston High School, then moved west to Aberdeen in 1939. In 1941 and 1942, he coached football at Central Washington College of Education—now Central Washington University—in Ellensburg, compiling a 6–6–3 record. The 1942 team was 4–1–1 in the Washington Intercollegiate Conference and won the conference title.

The program was suspended after the 1942 season due to World War II, and Sarboe coached in Tacoma at Lincoln High School, his alma mater. He had planned to return to Ellensburg to coach the high school team in 1945 and then return to Central Washington when it resumed football in 1946.

Hollingbery, the Cougars' head coach since 1926, was not brought back in 1945 and Sarboe was hired as head coach of the Cougars in late May, the first alumnus to head the football program. In his first season in Pullman, WSC posted a 6–2–1 record, but struggled afterward; Sarboe had a  record in five seasons and resigned in December 1949.

In 1966, he left to coach for a season at Hawaii and posted a 4–6 record. Sarboe then returned to northwest California and became a coach and athletic director at the College of the Redwoods, a junior college in Eureka, and retired in 1977.

Death
Sarboe died of cancer at age 74 in 1985 in Spokane.

Head coaching record

College football

References

External links
 
 

1911 births
1985 deaths

American football defensive backs
American football fullbacks
American football quarterbacks
Boston Redskins players
Brooklyn Dodgers (NFL) players
Central Washington Wildcats football coaches
Chicago Cardinals players
Hawaii Rainbow Warriors and Rainbow Wahine athletic directors
Hawaii Rainbow Warriors football coaches
Humboldt State Lumberjacks football coaches
Humboldt State Lumberjacks men's basketball coaches
Washington State Cougars football coaches
Washington State Cougars football players
College men's basketball head coaches in the United States
High school football coaches in Washington (state)
Sportspeople from Fairbanks, Alaska
Coaches of American football from Alaska
Coaches of American football from Washington (state)
Players of American football from Alaska
Players of American football from Tacoma, Washington
Basketball coaches from Alaska
Basketball coaches from Washington (state)